An American Girl: McKenna Shoots for the Stars (released in PAL territories as American Girl: Shooting for the Stars) is a 2012 American family drama film starring actress Jade Pettyjohn, Ysa Penarejo, Cathy Rigby, Nia Vardalos, and Ian Ziering. This film is based on the McKenna books in the American Girl series written by Mary Casanova. The film is also the second in the series to feature a Girl of the Year character, the first being Chrissa Stands Strong, and is the sixth film in the American Girl series overall.

The film is about the life of McKenna Brooks, as she struggles to balance her time at school and in her career as a gymnast. The screenplay was written by Jessica O'Toole and Amy Rardin. The movie was directed by Vince Marcello.

Plot
Fourth grader McKenna Brooks competes for Shooting Star gymnastics alongside her best friend Toulane Thomas. They both dream of competing in the 2016 Olympics. For now, their immediate goal is to make the regional competitive team. Mckenna practices backhandspring dismounts for her balance beam routine. However, her coach Isabelle Manning tells her that the move is too advanced for her and she should stick to the easier dismount for now. McKenna and Toulane acknowledge a new girl Sierra, a straight-A student, but also comment about a girl from another team who is generally considered the best and who they feel is pretty much sure to get one of the three spots.

After practice, McKenna has a family dinner at home with her parents and two sisters. Mr. and Mrs. Brooks then inform her that her teacher Mr. Wu e-mailed them saying McKenna's grades are slipping. He recommends she get a reading tutor from the middle school. McKenna's parents believe that she's spending too much time on gymnastics and not enough time on school. McKenna refuses and promises to bring her grades up as there's going to be a science quiz the next day. She starts to read the science book, but doesn't understand it and quits.

The next day at school McKenna struggles during the quiz and ends up cheating off of Sierra's paper. McKenna gets caught by Mr. Wu. and is given a zero. McKenna's parents then give her an ultamatium to either meet with the tutor or quit gymnastics, making her reluctantly agree to the former. The next day, McKenna meets her tutor Josie Myers, who uses a wheelchair, at the school's library. McKenna hides from Sierra to avoid embarrassment. After showing little progress, Josie suggests McKenna read "baby books", making her angry. She storms out of the library and asks Mr. Wu to find her a new tutor. She tries three different tutors who won't work for her and decides to go back to Josie.

At a presentation run, the Shooting Stars gymnastics team perform for the parents. Toulane and Sierra perform their floor routines well. McKenna performs her beam routine and disobeys her coach, but falls and breaks her ankle. McKenna is ruled out for 8 weeks but can do exercises that don't involve her broken foot in 2 weeks. Her parents say this gives her an opportunity to focus on her schoolwork but she gets angry saying her parents are glad this happened.

McKenna meets with Josie again but is caught by Sierra who reveals she had a tutor once too. McKenna feels better and apologizes to Josie and then learns she's into horses. McKenna suggests Josie look into programs that will allow her to ride one. As they progress, they start to develop a friendship. However, Toulane catches them and is upset at McKenna for lying. The Brooks family invites the Myers on a camping trip. While sharing a tent, McKenna reveals to Josie Toulaine's struggles with living up to her mother's expectations. While McKenna is reading A Little Princess, she starts to understand what she is reading. In her excitement, McKenna shows Josie her and Toulane's secret victory handshake, unaware that Toulane had been watching. Afterwards, Josie tells McKenna she inspired her and found a program that allows kids with disabilities to ride horses. She invites McKenna to go but she refuses, remembering she gets her cast off the same day. McKenna later decides to go to give Josie support, only to run into Toulane. Josie reveals she invited her too, and they make up. Meanwhile, Mr. Wu. assigns his class a reading project that involves a presentation the day after the qualifying meet. McKenna begins to feel a lot of pressure.

With the qualifying meet 3 weeks away, McKenna is cleared but becomes nervous with her dismount (the skill she was injured on). Meanwhile, her grades start to improve and she decides to do a presentation about athletes and becomes intrigued learning about them.

At the qualifying meet, McKenna finds Toulane who is upset and admits to her that she's sick of competitive gymnastics ever since her mother pushed her into it so that Toulane can follow in the footsteps of her older sister, a star gymnast. She tells McKenna that she has been watching the rhythmic gymnastics practices and wishes she could do that instead.

McKenna convinces her to talk with her mother after the meet. They both perform their floor routines well and Toulane even supports Sierra during her bar routine. 
McKenna hesitates on her beam dismount, but after seeing Josie in the audience, she goes for it and sticks the landing. She and Toulane are both named to the regional competitive team, but Toulane finally confronts her mother, and is finally allowed to switch to rhythmic gymnastics. She gives her place on the competitive team to a much-improved Sierra since she was named first alternate.

Toulane befriends Josie and they both watch McKenna's presentation. McKenna gives a speech about how grateful she was to have balance and says no one achieves greatness without help from others.

Cast 
 Jade Pettyjohn as McKenna Brooks, the 9-year-old protagonist of the movie who has a passion for gymnastics. (Kathryn White was Jade's gymnast double)
 Ysa Penarejo as Toulane Thomas, McKenna's best friend who even though she does gymnastics, doesn't enjoy it.
 Kally Berard as Sierra Kuchinko, the new girl in both McKenna's class and gymnastics team. She moved to Seattle from California after her parents got divorced. 
 Kerris Dorsey as Josefina "Josie" Myers, McKenna's tutor and close friend who is disabled.
 Ian Ziering as Mr. Brooks, McKenna's father who is a high school principal.
 Nia Vardalos as Mrs. Brooks, McKenna's mother who owns a coffee shop.
 Talia Pura as McKenna's maternal grandmother who lives with McKenna's family.
 Will Woytowich as Bob
 Paula Rivera as Mrs. Thomas, Toulane's mother who is very strict when it comes to making the Regional Competitive Team.
 George Chiang as Mr. Wu, McKenna's 4th Grade teacher who also went to gymnastics at McKenna's place.
 Aisha Alfa as Gymnastics Competition Announcer
 Abbey Thickson as Impatient Female Tutor
 Emma Leipsic as Megan Murphy, a gymnast from Performig Arts Gymnastics
 Rosie as Snowflake the horse, Josie's assigned horse she rode at Heart's and Horses
 Cathy Rigby as Coach Isabelle Manning, McKenna's strict, but caring gymnastics coach.
 Kadence Kendall Roach as Maisey Brooks, McKenna's 5-year-old sister and Mara's twin sister who also does gymnastics.
 Paiten Raine Roach as Mara Brooks, McKenna's 5-year-old sister and Maisey's twin sister who also does gymnastics.

Production
An American Girl: McKenna Shoots for the Stars was filmed in Riverbend Community School, Winnipeg, Manitoba, Canada.

It also featured Superchicks 2008 song Rock What You Got.

Release
The film was released on DVD and Blu-ray on July 3, 2012. It was initially only available at American Girl and Wal-Mart, but was eventually released in PAL territories as American Girl: Shooting for the Stars. The film aired on NBC on July 14, 2012.

A free screening of the film was held at the Tysons Corner Marriott on July 21, 2012, as part of a promotional package by American Girl and Marriott.

References

External links
 
 

McKenna Shoots for the Stars
Films based on American novels
American children's films
2012 directorial debut films
2012 films
2010s children's films
Gymnastics films
Films about Olympic gymnastics
Films shot in Winnipeg
Universal Pictures direct-to-video films
Films directed by Vince Marcello
2010s English-language films
2010s American films